Million Mile Reflections is the tenth studio album by Charlie Daniels and the seventh as the Charlie Daniels Band, released on April 20, 1979.  It is best known for the hit single "The Devil Went Down to Georgia".  The title refers to the band having passed the million mile mark in its touring.  The song "Reflections" is a tribute to Elvis Presley, Janis Joplin, and Ronnie Van Zant. Daniels dedicated the album to Van Zant, who was killed in the CV-240 plane crash on October 20, 1977.

Million Mile Reflections became the band's most commercially successful album, being certified triple-platinum in the US and peaking at number five on the Billboard Top LPs chart. It also reached number one on the Top Country Albums chart.

Record World said of the single "Behind Your Eyes" that "the hit-bound ballad features shimmering keyboards and a lyrical guitar run."

Track listing
All songs composed by the Charlie Daniels Band (Charlie Daniels, Tom Crain, Taz DiGregorio, Fred Edwards, Charles Hayward & James W. Marshall), except where indicated:

 "Passing Lane" - 3:17
 "Blue Star" - 3:40
 "Jitterbug" (Daniels, Crain, DiGregorio, Edwards, Hayward, Don Murray) - 3:11
 "Behind Your Eyes" (John Boylan) - 3:56
 "Reflections" - 5:26
 "The Devil Went Down to Georgia" - 3:34
 "Mississippi" (Daniels) - 3:10
 "Blind Man" (Crain) - 3:46
 "Rainbow Ride" - 7:24

The 8-track tape running order (Epic JEA 35751) differs from the original LP, as follows:

Program 1: Passing Lane - Blue Star - Jitterbug

Program 2: Reflections - The Devil Went Down To Georgia - Behind Your Eyes (Part 1)

Program 3: Behind Your Eyes (Concl) - Mississippi - Blind Man

Program 4: Rainbow Ride - The Devil Went Down To Georgia (Reprise)*

*"The Devil Went Down To Georgia (Reprise)" is a shorter version of "The Devil Went Down To Georgia" evidenced only by an earlier fade, likely to best program the 8-track tape to minimize a lengthy silent portion of Program 4 and minimize splitting more than one track over the four programs.

Chart performance

Album

Singles

Personnel
The Charlie Daniels Band:
Charlie Daniels - guitar, fiddle, vocals
Tom Crain - guitar, vocals
"Taz" DiGregorio - keyboards, vocals
Fred Edwards - drums, percussion
Charles Hayward - bass
James W. Marshall - drums, percussion

Additional personnel:
Bergen White - string arrangements on tracks 5 and 7
Lea Jane Singers - background vocals on tracks 3 and 5
Terry Mead - trumpet on "Jitterbug"

Production
Producer: John Boylan
Engineer: Paul Grupp
Assistant (recording): Steve Goostree
Mixed at Westlake Sound, Los Angeles, Ca.
Assistants (mixing): Dave Rideau, Erik Zobler
Production supervisor: Joseph E. Sullivan
Cover illustration: Bill Myers
Cover design: Virginia Team - Wm. J. Johnson

Catalog number
Original LP Catalog Number: Epic Records JE 35751
CD Catalog Number: Epic Records EK 35751

References

1979 albums
Epic Records albums
Charlie Daniels albums
Albums produced by John Boylan (record producer)